James Wilson (March 15, 1763 – March 26, 1855) was the first maker of globes in the United States.

Born in Londonderry, New Hampshire, Wilson farmed with his father and trained as a blacksmith, though he had little other formal education. He moved to Bradford, Vermont in 1796, became interested in cartography, and taught himself map making. He invested in an encyclopedia and taught himself engraving and map making with the intention of producing maps for schoolchildren.

When he visited Dartmouth College's European globe collection, he was inspired by a pair of terrestrial and celestial globes. He left determined to create his own, and produced a heavy wooden sphere covered with ink drawings on paper. Though this first attempt was too heavy and took too long to produce for it to be commercially feasible, Wilson continued look for ways to improve his product. He sought out an expert in copper engraving and studied with Amos Doolittle in order to master the art of engraving.

In 1813, he opened the first geographic globe factory in the US and sold his initial 13 inch globe for $50. The Wilson globes were widely successful, and Wilson expanded to production of sets of celestial and terrestrial globes in various sizes, materials and prices, including printed Papier-mâché, enabling them to be purchased inexpensively for use in schools and homes. Wilson increased his production to meet demand, and in partnership with his sons he opened a second factory in Albany, New York.

Wilson remained active until he was over eighty, when he created a planetarium for the Thetford Academy. The planetarium was well received, and he began offering them for sale.

Wilson died in Bradford on March 26, 1855, and was buried at Upper Plain Cemetery in Bradford.

His surviving globes are highly prized and can be found in libraries, museums and private collections. The Bradford rest area on Interstate 91 contains a historical marker indicating where his home and workshop stood and commemorating his accomplishments.

References
The Bradford Historical Society Museum at 172 North Main, Bradford, VT has an 1810 Wilson Globe in a custom-made case made for it by Bradford's Copeland Furniture Company.

External links
 
First American Globes
Famous Vermonters
Mapping the Republic

1763 births
1855 deaths
People from Londonderry, New Hampshire
People from Bradford, Vermont
American cartographers
American inventors
Burials in Vermont